Euspilapteryx auroguttella is a moth of the family Gracillariidae. It is known from all of Europe.

The wingspan is 9–10 mm.Antennae with apex white. Forewings dark fuscous, purplish- tinged ; a roundish spot below costa at 1/3, another on costa at 2/3, and two on dorsum
near base and before tornus bright yellow. Hindwings are grey.The larva is whitish-green ; dorsal line greener ; head pale yellow-brown.  
Adults are on wing in May and August in two generations.

The larvae feed on Hypericum adenotrichum, Hypericum elegans, Hypericum hircinum, Hypericum hirsutum, Hypericum humifusum, Hypericum maculatum, Hypericum montanum, Hypericum olympicum, Hypericum perforatum, Hypericum rhodoppeum and Hypericum tetrapterum. They mine the leaves of their host plant. The mine starts as a lower-surface epidermal corridor. The last section is widened into a blotch. Only then the larva begins to consume parenchymatous tissue and to line the inside of the mine with silk. The leaf folds itself around the mine. The frass is deposited in a clump in a corner of the mine. Older larvae leave the mine and live freely in a leaf tip that has been folded downwards.

References

Gracillariinae
Moths of Europe
Moths of Asia
Moths described in 1835